German union may refer to:

 Modern Germany, the result of the 1990 Reunification of Germany
 The German Empire, the result of the 1871 Unification of Germany
 The unrealized aim of the 1848 Frankfurt Constitution
 The German Confederation, the result of the 1815 Congress of Vienna
 The North German Confederation, the result of the 1866 North German Confederation Treaty
 The Holy Roman Empire
 Trade unions in Germany
 CDU/CSU, also known as the Union, a political alliance in Germany

See also
 German Union, a short-lived secret society during the Enlightenment era